Nordharz ("north Harz") was a Verwaltungsgemeinschaft ("collective municipality") in the district of Harz, in Saxony-Anhalt, Germany. It was situated north of the Harz mountain range and the town of Wernigerode. The seat of the Verwaltungsgemeinschaft was in Veckenstedt. It was disbanded on 1 January 2010.

Subdivision
The Verwaltungsgemeinschaft Nordharz consisted of the following municipalities (population as of 2006):

 Abbenrode (946)
 Derenburg (2,662)
 Heudeber (1,273)
 Langeln (1,110)
 Reddeber (880)
 Schmatzfeld (355)
 Stapelburg (1,391)
 Veckenstedt (1,475)
 Wasserleben (1,540)

External links
 Nordharz official site

References

Former Verwaltungsgemeinschaften in Saxony-Anhalt